Kisumu Telkom is a Kenyan football club based in Kisumu.  The club was formerly known as Kisumu Postal, the name was changed in 1998. They were a member of the top division in Kenyan football.  Their home stadium is Moi Stadium. The club relegated from Kenyan Premier League after 2005–2006 but the next season did not take part in Nationwide League, the second-tier league in Kenya.

The club is owned by Telkom Kenya.

Performance in CAF competitions
 CAF Cup: 1 appearance
1992 – Second Round

Football clubs in Kenya
Sport in Nyanza Province
Kisumu
Works association football clubs in Kenya